Schizolaena exinvolucrata is a tree in the family Sarcolaenaceae. It is endemic to Madagascar.

Description
The peduncle and sepals are glabrous. It has a fleshy, glabrous involucre. The involucre is thought to attract lemurs, bats and birds who in turn disperse the tree's seeds.

Distribution and habitat
Schizolaena exinvolucrata is known only from the eastern regions of Atsimo-Atsinanana, Vatovavy-Fitovinany, Alaotra-Mangoro, Analanjirofo, Atsinanana and Anosy. Its habitat is humid and subhumid forests from sea-level to  altitude.

Threats
Schizolaena exinvolucrata is threatened by deforestation due to shifting patterns of agriculture. Four of the tree's subpopulations (of 13) are within protected areas.

References

exinvolucrata
Endemic flora of Madagascar
Trees of Madagascar
Plants described in 1883